David Freeman Hawke (died  1999 at age 75) was an American historian. His book Benjamin Rush: Revolutionary Gadfly became a National Book Award nominee in 1972. Hawke was born in Philadelphia and held degrees from Swarthmore College, the University of Wisconsin and the University of Pennsylvania. He taught at Pace College for 14 years before joining Lehman College in 1972. He retired in 1986.

Life 
Hawke was born in Philadelphia, Pennsylvania, United States.

He died in 1999 in Madison, Connecticut, United States.

Career 
He was professor emeritus of American history at Lehman College of the City University of New York.

Bibliography

References

Year of birth missing
1999 deaths
Writers from Philadelphia
Historians from Pennsylvania
Lehman College faculty
Pace University faculty
Swarthmore College alumni
University of Pennsylvania alumni
University of Wisconsin–Madison alumni
20th-century American historians
20th-century American male writers
American male non-fiction writers